Kasnazan is a town located in west Erbil Governorate in Kurdistan Region, Iraq. The town populated by Kurds

References

Populated places in Erbil Governorate
Kurdish settlements in Iraq